Giotto is a crater on Mercury. It has a diameter of 144 kilometers. Its name was adopted by the International Astronomical Union (IAU) in 1976. Giotto is named for the Italian painter Giotto di Bondone, who lived from 1271 to 1377.

Hollows are scattered across the floor of Giotto.

Lermontov crater is to the northeast of Giotto.  Chaikovskij is to the southeast.  Veronese and Mistral are to the south.

References

Giotto di Bondone
Impact craters on Mercury